The 1998 Major League Soccer College Draft was held in Fort Lauderdale, Florida on January 31 and February 1, 1998. The College Draft was followed by the 1998 MLS Supplemental Draft.

Format
On Saturday, January 31, 1998, Major League Soccer held the first round of its 1998 college draft during the halftime of the Umbro Select All-Star Classic at Lockhart Stadium. The second and third rounds took place Sunday morning at the Airport Hilton in Fort Lauderdale. The 1998 MLS Supplemental Draft took place that afternoon at the same location.

Changes from 1997
 1998 expansion teams Miami Fusion and Chicago Fire were awarded the first and second selections in each round.

Round 1

Round 1 trades

Round 2

Round 2 trades

Round 3

Round 3 trades

Notable undrafted players
 Joe Cannon (GK, UC Santa Barbara) — 86 career MLS shutouts; MLS Goalkeeper of the Year (2002, 2004)
 Jimmy Conrad (DF, UCLA) — 288 MLS appearances, MLS Best XI (2004, 2005, 2006, 2008)

References

External links
 Umbro Tournament Offers Preview Of Revamped Lockhart

Major League Soccer drafts
Draft
MLS College Draft
Soccer in Florida
Sports in Fort Lauderdale, Florida
Events in Fort Lauderdale, Florida
MLS College Draft
MLS College Draft